Barry Martyn (born Barry Martyn Godfrey, February 23, 1941, in London) is an English jazz drummer, active principally on the New Orleans jazz revival circuit.

Martyn began on drums in 1955, and was leading his first band the following year. His first recordings were made in 1959. His first visit to New Orleans was in 1961, where he studied under Cie Frazier, and founded Mono Records. He toured Europe with many famed New Orleans jazz personnel, including George Lewis, Albert Nicholas, Louis Nelson, Captain John Handy, and Percy Humphrey. He moved to Los Angeles in 1972, and founded the Legends of Jazz, an ensemble which made several worldwide tours and recorded extensively. He returned to New Orleans in 1984, where he did work with George Buck, reissuing much of the Circle Records back catalogue. He played with Barney Bigard in 1976, and has recorded many dates as a leader.

References

Bibliography
Walking with Legends: Barry Martyn's New Orleans Jazz Odyssey. Edited by Mick Burns. Louisiana State University Press. 2007. .

External links
Scott Yanow, [ Barry Martyn] at AllMusic
Barry Martyn papers at The Historic New Orleans Collection

1941 births
Living people
English jazz drummers
British male drummers
Jazz musicians from New Orleans
American male jazz musicians